The Basketball League Belgium is a governing body for basketball in Belgium. It directs the ten professional Belgian basketball sports clubs of the top-tier Basketball League Belgium Division I.

See also
Basketball League Belgium Division I

References

External links
 
 Eurobasket.com League Page

Basketball governing bodies in Europe
Basketball in Belgium
 
Bas